Lukáš Žejdl (born August 7, 1991) is a Czech professional ice hockey right winger currently playing for HC Litvinov of the Czech Extraliga.

Žejdl previously played for HC Slavia Praha and HC Oceláři Třinec before joining Mladá Boleslav in 2015 in an initial loan spell. After another loan spell for the 2016-17 season, Žejdl joined Mladá Boleslav permanently in 2017.

After spending half of 2019-20 with BK Mladá Boleslav and half on loan with HK Hradec Kralove, Zejdl signed to play with HC Litvinov for the 2020-21 season.

References

External links
  iDNES.cz - Lukáš Žejdl

1991 births
Living people
HC Berounští Medvědi players
Czech ice hockey right wingers
BK Mladá Boleslav players
HC Most players
HC Oceláři Třinec players
Sportspeople from Most (city)
HC Slavia Praha players
HC Litvínov players
Stadion Hradec Králové players